Calothamnus tuberosus is a plant in the myrtle family, Myrtaceae and is endemic to the south-west of Western Australia. It is a stiff, prickly plant with cylindrical leaves and red flowers, growing near or often on granite boulders. It has a lignotuber and tuberous roots. (In 2014 Craven, Edwards and Cowley proposed that the species be renamed Melaleuca tuberosa.)

Description

The flowers are rich red and in small dense spikes amongst the leaves or on the older, leafless branches . The stamens are arranged in 4 claw-like bundles, all usually with 12 to 16 stamens per bundle. Flowering occurs from November to January, although sometimes in other months, depending on weather conditions. Flowering is followed by fruits which are woody, almost spherical capsules,  in diameter.

Taxonomy and naming
Calothamnus tuberosus was first formally described in 1984 by Trevor Hawkeswood in the botanical journal Nuytsia. The specific epithet (tuberosus) is a Latin word meaning "full of lumps".

Distribution and habitat
Calothamnus tuberosus occurs on or close to rocky granite outcrops from the Barbalin area to Peak Charles in the Avon Wheatbelt, Coolgardie, Esperance Plains and Mallee biogeographic regions.<ref name=FloraBase>{{FloraBase|name = Calothamnus tuberosus’'|id = 5432}}</ref>

ConservationCalothamnus tuberosus'' is classified as "not threatened" by the Western Australian Government Department of Parks and Wildlife.

References

tuberosus
Myrtales of Australia
Plants described in 1984
Endemic flora of Western Australia